María Natalia Mauleón Piñón (born 4 February 2002) is a Mexican professional footballer who plays as a forward for Liga MX Femenil club América.

Career
Mauleón was born in Acuitzio, Michoacán on 4 February 2002.

Mauleón moved with her family to Tepotzotlán, State of Mexico and was invited by Toluca for trials at the club's facilities in 2017. Afterwards, she signed for Toluca.

International career
Mauleón was part of the Mexico U-17 women's national football team. She participated in the 2018 CONCACAF Women's U-17 Championship, where the Mexican squad were runners-up.

Mauleón was also part of the team that finished as runners-up of the 2018 FIFA U-17 Women's World Cup in Uruguay, losing the final against Spain. Mauleón played all Mexico's six matches, but scored no goals.

Career statistics

Club

Honours

Mexico U-17 women's national football team
 CONCACAF Women's U-17 Championship: Runners-up: 2018
 FIFA U-17 Women's World Cup: Runners-up: 2018

References

External links

2002 births
Living people
Mexican women's footballers
Footballers from Michoacán
Mexican footballers
Liga MX Femenil players
Deportivo Toluca F.C. (women) footballers
Mexico women's youth international footballers
Women's association footballers not categorized by position